The Jajrud (Jājrūd), also spelled as Jajrood, Djadjéroud or Djaderoud, is a river in northern Iran that passes through the provinces of Mazandaran and Tehran. It flows south through the central Alborz mountain range. It is a tributary of the Karaj River, which empties into the endorheic Namak Lake basin.

Central Alborz mountain range map
Number 5 on the lower side of map shows the Jajrud.

See also
 Rasanan

References

Rivers of Mazandaran Province
Alborz (mountain range)
Landforms of Tehran Province
Rivers of Tehran Province